The Beverly Connection is a large power center in Beverly Grove, Los Angeles, across La Cienega Boulevard from the Beverly Center mall. It was originally proposed to be  in size but was scaled down to its opening size of  due to concerns about traffic congestion, availability of parking and overdevelopment in the neighborhood.

It opened in January 1989 with anchors including a Ralphs supermarket, Cost Plus Imports, Physico Fitness Superstores, The Wherehouse record store.

Later a cinema multiplex opened in the complex, as General Cinemas, later AMC Theatres.

The original design had 358,117 square feet of commercial space including retail and restaurants, the 1,875-seat theater complex and approximately 28,868 square feet of office space. The center was renovated in 2006–7; the cinemas were demolished and the center added condominiums and assisted living residences.

Current anchors
Current anchors include Ross Dress For Less, Target, Nordstrom Rack, Saks Fifth Avenue - Off Fifth, TJMaxx, Marshalls, CVS Pharmacy, and Old Navy.

References

Shopping malls in Los Angeles
Fairfax, Los Angeles
Power centers (retail) in the United States